Gondal State is one of the eight first class princely states of Kathiawar Agency, Bombay Presidency in  India. the capital of the state is Gondal town.

History
Gondal State is established in 1634 AD by Thakore Shri Kumbhoji I Meramanji, who received Ardoi and other villages from his father Meramanji.

With his fourth descendant Kumbhoji IV, the State raised itself, by acquiring the parganas of Dhoraji, Upleta, Sarai, and Patanvav, among others. The late ruler of Gondal State, Maharaja Bhojrajji Bhagwatsimhji, signed the instrument of accession to the Indian Union on 15 February 1948.

Rulers
The rulers of Gondal are Thakurs of the Jadeja dynasty who had the right to an 11 gun salute. They bore the title 'Thakur Sahib' from 1866 onwards.

Thakurs

Thakur Sahib

Regency
16 Sep 1878 – 24 August 1884  Regency
 W. Scott (to Jun 1882)
 Jayashankar Lalshankar (to Feb 1882)
 Bhagvat Sinhji (from Feb 1882)
 Hancock (acting for Scott Dec 1880 – Feb 1881)
 Nutt (from Jun 1882 [and acting for Scott Aug 1881 – Jan 1882])

See also
Political integration of India
Baroda, Western India and Gujarat States Agency

External links

 Gondal genealogy and History Queensland University
 Princes, diwans and merchants by Bhalodia-Dhanani, Aarti – University of Texas – Austin : education and reform in colonial India --Depiction of Gondal as one of the illustrative kingdom

Kathiawar Agency
Princely states of Gujarat
Rajkot district
1634 establishments in India
1949 disestablishments in India
Former monarchies of South Asia
Former countries in South Asia
Former protectorates
Jadejas
History of Gujarat